The Palmer-Moore Company (1906–1918) was a manufacturer of gasoline and air-cooled motor engines and marine engines in Syracuse, New York.  The company began production of commercial trucks beginning in 1912. They were the third manufacturer in the city in the business and specialized in the manufacture of custom designs for local industries.

Advertisements

External links 

Motor vehicle manufacturers based in Syracuse, New York
Defunct motor vehicle manufacturers of the United States
Defunct companies based in Syracuse, New York
Manufacturing companies established in 1906
Vehicle manufacturing companies disestablished in 1918
1906 establishments in New York (state)
1918 disestablishments in New York (state)